Jill Reynolds (born 1956) is an American contemporary artist. She is known for her work in glass, often as glass art installations that address trauma.

Early life
Reynolds was born in 1956 in Chicago, Illinois. In 1979, she earned a bachelor's degree in architecture from the Evergreen State College in Olympia, Washington. She received a Master of Fine Arts degree from Rutgers University in 1996.

Career
In 2003, she was an artist-in-residence at the Pittsburgh Glass Center. Her work is included in the collections of the Seattle Art Museum, the New Britain Museum of American Art, the Corning Museum of Glass, and the Tacoma Art Museum.

References

1956 births
20th-century American women artists
21st-century American women artists
American glass artists
Living people
Evergreen State College alumni
Rutgers University alumni
American women installation artists
American installation artists
Artists from Chicago